This article gives the discography for the British rock band The Pigeon Detectives. Since their formation in 2006 they have released four studio albums and 11 singles that have charted in the top 40 of the UK Singles Chart.

The band released their debut album, Wait for Me, in summer 2007 to critical acclaim and it sold well, reaching number 3 on the UK Albums Chart. Four singles were released from the album: "I Found Out" was first released in 2006 and re-released a year later; "Take Her Back" (number 20), "Romantic Type" (number 19) and "I'm Not Sorry" (number 12) all charted in the top 20.

In 2008 the Pigeon Detectives released their second album, Emergency and released the single "This Is an Emergency", which charted at number 14. They have also released the single "Everybody Wants Me", which peaked at number 51. "Say It Like You Mean It" was the last single from the album.

On 1 February 2011, the Pigeon Detectives announced their third album Up, Guards and at 'Em!, which was released on 4 April 2011. The album's lead single, "Done in Secret", was released on 28 March 2011.

Albums

Singles

Notes

References

Discographies of British artists
Rock music group discographies